is a Japanese manga series written and illustrated by Mitsuru Hattori. The manga was serialized in Kodansha's Bessatsu Shōnen Magazine between December 2009 and September 2014 and compiled in eleven tankōbon volumes. The series has been licensed and is published in North America by Kodansha USA. An anime television adaptation by Studio Deen aired in Japan from April 5 to June 28, 2012. A novel adaptation by Ryō Suzukaze was published by Kodansha in July 2012.

Plot
Chihiro Furuya is a male high school student with a keen interest in zombies, collecting zombie-related videogames, film and manga, and even to the point of desiring to "kiss a zombie girl". Following the death of his pet cat, Babu, he attempts to revive it using an old manuscript, which describes the process of creating a potion for resurrection. At this time, he encounters a girl named Rea Sanka, who has run away from home. In an attempt to commit suicide, she drinks a sample of the "resurrection" potion which is created from the poisonous Hydrangea macrophylla flower, although this fails to kill her. Following an argument with her father, she falls from a cliff by accident and dies. However, as a result of the potion, she becomes a zombie who eats hydrangea leaves to survive. The story follows the life of Chihiro and his new 'zombie girlfriend'.

Characters

Main characters

Chihiro is the necrophilic protagonist. One day, he finds an old manuscript and follows the directions to make a "resurrection" potion to bring his dead cat back to life as a zombie. He performs his research into zombies in the old abandoned building and he sometimes sees Rea at the well near the building, lamenting her life. He promises Rea that he'll take responsibility if she becomes a zombie. After Rea moves into his residence, he conducts research on preserving Rea's body in a tent in his own room. He wants his first kiss to be given by a female zombie, which later he experiences firsthand when Rea kisses him. He also experiences becoming a half-zombie, after he is stabbed by Dan'ichirō with a fencing sword. In the Anime this was due to Rea licking clean a wound that he acquired after she saved him from being hit by a car (although the effects were only temporary). In the Manga she had bitten his lip when she 'kissed' him. Chihiro enjoys seeing Rea dressed as a Bunny Girl or a Nurse. Despite the fact that he's not interested in living girls, he fell in love with Rea when she was still alive, which he confesses to her while Rea is trying to devour him, which brings her to her senses. He tries to approach her afterwards but has difficulties given the incident and Rea's own embarrassment. In the manga, it's hinted that his interest in zombies may be due to his mother having been turned into a zombie. She had apparently died in a car accident and was brought back for a short period (by Jogorō) before becoming permanently dead. In the end of the manga, Chihiro's heart was eaten by Rea, but he was given an artificial heart to survive.

Rea is the heroine title character of the story who steals and drinks a zombie potion made by Chihiro in an attempt to commit suicide because of years of sexual and emotional abuse by her father. Although he hadn't had sex with her (although it might have been leading up to that) he had touched her in a manner that made her uncomfortable, took nude pictures of her on her birthdays "to note her growth", had her watched and photographed constantly, fired any maid who acted 'inappropriately' (like letting Rea play with a stray cat), and he forced the family of the one friend she had confided in about his behavior to move away. The potion wasn't enough to kill her, but she was resurrected as a zombie after her father accidentally knocked her off a cliff (the fall would not have killed her, except that she encountered a tree stump on the way down which tore into her stomach). As a zombie, she lives together with Chihiro in order to know how it feels to become free from her father's control. In chapter 12, she calls Mero "Mero-chan", similar to how Mero remembers her mother. Rea likes Chihiro and feels that she is interfering in Chihiro and Ranko's relationship, although Ranko later encourages her to try harder, which she does, albeit with embarrassment. She seems to understand Bābu and is the only zombie that Jogorō and Darin have seen able to defy her instincts at the 2nd stage of zombification, possibly due to her having drunk the potion before dying (which Darin suggests no other zombie has done). She's also physically strong, since her body is no longer restrained by her brain as a result of her death. (There are several 'governors' in the brain and body which limits action to prevent moving faster and stronger than the flesh can endure. So, while Rea could punch a hole in a steel door, the action would severely damage her arm.) In the arc in which they visit "Zoma" she suffers from memory loss due to the removal of her brain cells. Although she can only remember very few of her buried, yet etched memories, her memories of Chihiro remain vague and unclear. She gains her memories back when she eats Chihiro's heart.

Ranko is the first cousin of Chihiro. Often called Wanko by Chihiro, at times she says that Chihiro should use "-san" after her name. Ranko has liked Chihiro for some time (Since he saved her from a dog when she was about 6 years old.) and develops a rivalry with Rea although she also likes to tease them. She eventually confesses to Chihiro, but realizes before he can answer that he loves Rea. She has accepted that her love is unrequited for now, but hasn't given up and occasionally does something reckless such as ingesting a bottle of Resurrection Pills to turn herself into a zombie. Fortunately this failed since Darin was too lazy to change the bottle label and she merely passed out from a minor allergic reaction.

Mero is the younger sister of Chihiro. She's named after George Romero. Unlike Chihiro, she is obsessed with ghosts. She doesn't remember much about her mother except for the fact that her hands were wrapped in bandages. In some of her memories of her mother, she remembered her mother asking about her fever, stating that she had forgotten that she can't tell temperature. She sees her mother's image in Rea, subconsciously calling her mother.

Furuya family

Jogorō is Chihiro and Mero's grandfather also known as Professor Boil. He's the creator of the recipe for the Resurrection potion. He was a well-respected professor in the United States researching zombies, and performed a multitude of experiments with them. He however left his research for unknown reasons, and although he still has great knowledge of zombies he rarely says anything useful due to his senility. After discovering Rea in the shower, he mistakes her for someone by the name of Sada (his first wife from the Meiji period). He occasionally states how Sada has been resurrected but no one ever knows who he is talking about, considering that was not a name they were familiar with. People then dismiss it as being caused by his senility. Later it is revealed that his senility and bad eyesight are side effects of exposure to fatal amounts of poison. Occasionally, events trigger brief periods of sanity which allow him to clearly tell Chihiro how to keep Rea conscious and in good shape as well as inform him that the Resurrection potion is incomplete. The measures revealed by Jogorō will only slow down, but not stop decay, so eventually Rea will rot away unless Chihiro comes up with a better solution.

Chihiro and Mero's father and also the priest at the Shiryō-ji temple.

Chihiro and Mero's late mother, who died prior to the series. It's hinted that after a fatal car accident she was revived as a zombie for a short while, most likely by Grandfather Jogorō. Evidence of this is seen in Mero's flashbacks where her mother has bandaged hands and remarks that she can't tell Mero's temperature from her forehead with her hand anymore. Some of the flashbacks are triggered by Rea acting in a similar manner to Yuzune. At some point Yuzune says goodbye (most likely because she started hungering for the flesh of her loved ones) and dies completely.

Babu is Chihiro's pet cat that died in a car accident three days prior to the start of the series. He's named after the tamed zombie in the movie Day of the Dead however in the anime it is stated he is named after the sound he makes due to his seemingly permanent nasal congestion. He was brought back to life by Chihiro while doing resurrection research on him. Rea seems to understand Babu as a zombie. Like Rea, his body is not restrained by his brain and he was able to kill a fox much bigger than himself. However, unlike Rea, he has not been able to stave off his zombie instincts. This causes him to enter a 'Confused' state at night where he preys on other animals. Although he hasn't attacked any humans yet, as time passes he'll eventually degenerate to the point where he'll not only be confused during the day, but will become a mindless zombie seeking the flesh of any living thing just like feral zombies in movies - something Rea herself faces unless Chihiro can find a solution.

Other characters

Dan'ichirō is the overprotective father of Rea. His "love" for his daughter is almost incestuous, although he hadn't gotten to the point where he was having sex with her (at least not up to the point that she turned into a zombie). However, he had a habit of taking pictures of his daughter and having her watched whenever she left the mansion. On her birthdays he would take naked pictures of Rea claiming it was to 'note her development.' After facing Chihiro and Rea in his fencing room, he accepts Chihiro as Rea's protector but gives him a firm warning that there should be no "sexual intercourse before marriage". He heads to the US shortly thereafter to search for a way to stop Rea from decaying. His obsession with Rea seems to be a twisted form of the love he had for his first wife who died giving birth to Rea, and whom she greatly resembles. She had been one of the spectators at a Sanka endorsed fencing match and had complimented him for the skill he showed, even if the match had been set up. (He was angry that his opponents weren't fighting him seriously because the Sanka family had rigged the entire event to make him look good.)

Aria is Rea's stepmother. She used to be a maid for Dan'ichirō and was trained under a long-standing tradition in the Sanka family that future heirs are to marry the best of the maids. The maids were selected from good families and taught how to be ladies in areas such as deportment, grace, etc. so as to be suitable trophy wives if selected to marry into the family. Dan'ichirō however met and married Rea's mother whom he loved dearly until her death giving birth to Rea. Although Dan'ichirō subsequently married Aria, he did not pay her any attention instead watching over Rea, which made theirs a strained relationship at best. As a result she treated Rea coldly, tried to get Dan'ichirō interested in her, and was drunk most of the time when she wasn't working as Chairwoman of Rea's school. She secretly despises Rea due to how she's loved by everyone and is the sole object of Dan'ichirō's obsession. She tried to seduce Chihiro after finding out Rea had turned into zombie, but she was coldly rejected with Chihiro telling her he only loves undead girls.

Jogorō Furuya's former assistant, who wishes to use Rea as a research subject. She is vastly knowledgeable about zombies but her information is still inferior to the breadth Jogorō's knowledge, although the fact that she's more reliable than Jogorō (whose mind is deteriorating) creates a give-and-take relationship with both Chihiro and Rea. Her attitude slowly begins to change when Rea treats her as a friend. She has a modified zombie cyborg owl named . She also works for Jogorō's former organization, ZoMA. She became interested in Zombie Research because that was the only time her father ever paid any attention to her and not zombies. Her primary interest in Rea is to use her as a means of regaining her father's attention. However, due to a lack of empathy on his part, (along with severe psychological issues and insanity) she'll never be more important than his own obsessions. She is the first to realize that part of the reason Rea is able to hold onto her personality better than other zombies is that she ingested the Resurrection potion while she was still alive. All of the zombie test subjects that Darin had researched had been dead for at least a few hours before being given the potion. Despite looking and acting like a mature young woman she is only 14 years old. She also gives herself small doses of zombie poison to disable her limiters while remaining alive. As the doses are small they won't kill her or cause loss of vision and brain damage. A side effect of this treatment is that ability to feel pain is suppressed as well and she can damage herself without realizing it if she's not careful. As a result if she were to run at superhuman speeds, for example, she would not feel her leg muscles straining and not realize that anything was wrong until the damage was too great for her legs to function anymore.

Media

Manga
The original manga by Mitsuru Hattori began serialization in Kodansha's Bessatsu Shōnen Magazine. The series' first chapter was published in the magazine's January 2010 issue, released on December 9, 2009, and the last one ran in its October 2014 issue, released on September 9, 2014. The series was also compiled in eleven tankōbon volumes, published between June 9, 2014, and November 11, 2014. The 5th, 6th, 7th and 8th volumes were published simultaneously with limited editions. The 5th volume's limited edition was bundled with drama CD, telling an original story. The limited editions of the 6th and 7th volumes were bundled with a DVD containing an original anime episode each. The limited edition of the 8th volume was bundled with three bathroom posters with erotic depictions of the series' heroines.

Kodansha USA have licensed the series in North America under the title Sankarea: Undying Love and have released all eleven volumes in English between June 11, 2013 and March 24, 2015.

Anime

A 12-episode anime television series based on the manga was announced in the October 2011 issue of Bessatsu Shōnen Magazine, and aired in Japan between April 5 and June 28, 2012. Two original video animation episodes were released with the limited edition of the 6th and 7th volumes of the manga on June 8 and November 9, 2012. A third OVA episode was released with the 6th Blu-ray Disc and DVD volumes on November 30, 2012. The series has been licensed in North America by Funimation, released the series dubbed in English on Blu-ray Disc and DVD on October 1, 2013. It was then discovered that the release contained the edited version, Funimation has since recalled and postponed a release on Blu-ray/DVD with the uncensored material, no news of a proper release date was announced until Funimation announced a March 31, 2015 release for the uncut complete series. Customers who have received the edited version can opt to return their copy for refund or exchange their copy for the unedited version when it is distributed. MVM Films has licensed the series in the United Kingdom.

Novel
A novel adaptation was published by Kodansha under their Kodansha Ranobe Bunko imprint on July 2, 2013. The novel, titled , was written by Ryō Suzukaze and illustrated by Mitsuru Hattori.

Sales
According to Oricon, the complete third volume compilation of the manga sold 24,363 copies, while the fourth volume sold 44,120 copies (making it rank #19 of Japanese manga sales in mid-August 2011).

Notes

References

External links
  Sankarea manga official website at Studio Hami
  Sankarea manga official website at Kodansha
  Sankarea anime official website at TBS
 

2012 anime television series debuts
2009 manga
Animated television series about cats
Comics about cats
Comics about death
Funimation
Human-zombie romance in fiction
Incest in anime and manga
Kodansha manga
Kodansha Ranobe Bunko
Mitsuru Hattori
Romantic comedy anime and manga
Shōnen manga
Studio Deen
TBS Television (Japan) original programming
Zombies in anime and manga